Machaerotidae are a family of bugs in the superfamily  Cercopoidea which were formerly grouped with the other cercopids. They are sometimes called as tube-forming spittle-bugs as the nymphs form a calcareous tube within which they live. These bugs are mainly found in the Old World tropics. The adults of many genera have a long, free and spine-like process originating at the scutellum and thus superficially similar to the tree-hoppers, Membracidae. Its tegmen or forewing, like typical bugs of the suborder Heteroptera, always has a distinct, membranous apical area. 

Like other cercopoids, these are xylem-sap feeders. The nymph extracts calcium from the xylem fluid and constructs a calcareous tube from Malphigian gland secretions on some woody dicotyledons and immerses itself in a rather clear fluid excretion inside the tube. The tube strongly resembles the shell of certain serpulid sea worms or helicoid land snails and contain no less than 75% calcium carbonate. This habit is quite uncommon in the class Insecta and markedly different from that of typical cercopoids or spittlebugs, which make and live in a froth mass either below or above ground. Machaerotids produce foam only when they emerge from the tube to moult. There are about 115 species in 31 genera placed in 4 tribes. The majority of species are found in Southeast Asia with a small number for Africa. They were traditionally separated into two subfamilies Machaerotinae which have the scutellar spine and Enderleiniinae which lack it. A third family, also lacking the spine, Apomachaerotinae, was introduced in 2014. The scutellum has a "tail" or appears raised towards the posterior end.

A list of the subfamilies, tribes and genera is as follows:
 Apomachaerotinae 
 Apomachaerota 
 Serreia 
 Machaerotinae
 Maxudeini
 Blastacaen 
 Conditor 
 Maxudea 
 Machaerotini
 Dianmachaerota 
 Grypomachaerota 
 Irridiculum 
 Machaerota 
 Platymachaerota 
 Romachaeta 
 Sigmasoma 
 Tapinacaena 
 Enderleiniinae
 Hindoloidini
 Aphrosiphon 
 Hindoloides 
 Kyphomachaerota 
 Trigonurella 
 Enderleiniini
 Aecalusa 
 Allox 
 Chaetophyes 
 Enderleinia 
 Hindola 
 Labramachaerota 
 Labrosyne 
 Machaeropsis 
 Makiptyelus 
 Neuroleinia 
 Neuromachaerota 
 Pectinariophyes 
 Polychaetophyes 
 Taihorina

References

Cercopoidea
Auchenorrhyncha families